Rrapo Hekali (?-1847) was an Albanian fighter born in Hekal, Mallakaster. He is famous for his role in Albanian revolt of 1847. After those events he was captured and prisoned by Ottoman forces. He died in the end of December 1847 in the Ottoman prison of Manastir.

References

Sources

1847 deaths
Year of birth unknown
Albanian activists
19th-century Albanian people
People from Mallakastër
People from Janina vilayet
Albanian people who died in prison custody
Prisoners who died in Ottoman detention